Men's 10 metre air pistol made its Olympic debut at the 1988 Summer Olympics. Erich Buljung equalled the world record (held by Vladas Turla and Igor Basinski) of 590 points in the qualification round, acquiring a two-point lead over the new 50 metre champion, Sorin Babii. Neither of them performed a good final however, and Tanyu Kiryakov eliminated his entire five-point gap to first place. The tie between Kiryakov and Buljung was resolved on grounds of higher final score, with Kiryakov becoming the inaugural champion. Xu Haifeng surpassed Babii to win bronze.

Qualification round

DNS Did not start – EWR Equalled world record – OR Olympic record – Q Qualified for final

Final

OR Olympic record

References

Sources

Shooting at the 1988 Summer Olympics
Men's events at the 1988 Summer Olympics